Fender may refer to:

Transport
 Fender (boating), a bumper used to keep boats from banging into docks or each other
 Fender (vehicle) or wing, a part of a motor vehicle that frames a wheel well 
 Fender, a "cow catcher" on a tram, see Pilot (locomotive)
 Fender, part of a Western saddle

Other uses
 Fender (company), a U.S. manufacturer of stringed musical instruments and amplifiers
 List of products manufactured by Fender Musical Instruments Corporation
 Fender (surname), a surname
 Fender, Arkansas, a community in the United States
 Fender Pinwheeler, a fictional character in the 2005 film Robots
 The Fenders, a Brazilian rock band
 Fireplace fender, a fireplace accessory

See also

 The Fender IV, a U.S. garage rock band
 
 Fend (disambiguation)